Ryszard Olszewski (7 June 1932 – 2 February 2020) was a Polish basketball player. He competed in the men's tournament at the 1960 Summer Olympics.

References

External links
 

1932 births
2020 deaths
Polish men's basketball players
Olympic basketball players of Poland
Basketball players at the 1960 Summer Olympics
People from Inowrocław
Sportspeople from Kuyavian-Pomeranian Voivodeship